Edgard Tytgat (Brussels, 28 April 1879 – Woluwe-Saint-Lambert, 11 January 1957) was a Belgian painter.

1879 births
1957 deaths
Artists from Brussels
20th-century Belgian painters